Wanaku Kimray (Quechua wanaku guanaco, kimray slope, "guanaco slope", also spelled Huanaco Quimray) is a  mountain in the Bolivian Andes. It is located in the Chuquisaca Department, Azurduy Province, Tarvita Municipality. Wanaku Kimray lies southwest of Wallqayuq Urqu and north of Muyu Urqu.

References 

Mountains of Chuquisaca Department